Minuartia howellii is an uncommon species of flowering plant in the family Caryophyllaceae known by the common names Howell's stitchwort and Howell's sandwort.

It is native to the Klamath Mountains of northwestern California and southwestern Oregon. It grows in serpentine soils in chaparral and woodland habitat.

Description
Minuartia howellii is a slightly hairy annual herb growing to a maximum height of 30 centimeters with a slender green stem which turns purple with age.

The thin, rigid, almost needlelike leaves are linear or narrowly lance-shaped, up to 1.5 centimeters long and under 2 millimeters wide.

The tiny flower has five white petals each a few millimeters long and smaller, ribbed sepals.

External links
Calflora: Minuartia howellii
Jepson Manual Treatment
USDA Plants Profile
Flora of North America
Photo gallery

howellii
Flora of California
Flora of Oregon
Flora of the Klamath Mountains
Natural history of the California chaparral and woodlands
Flora without expected TNC conservation status